Interferon-induced protein with tetratricopeptide repeats 2 or IFIT2  is a protein found in humans which is encoded by the IFIT2 gene.

Clinical significance 

IFIT2 may play a role in prevention of tumor progression. Indeed, IFIT2 gene has been detected progressively downregulated in Human papillomavirus-positive neoplastic keratinocytes derived from uterine cervical preneoplastic lesions at different levels of malignancy. For this reason, this gene is likely to be associated with tumorigenesis and may be a potential prognostic marker for uterine cervical preneoplastic lesions progression.

References

Further reading